Chanda Rubin and Linda Wild were the defending champions but did not compete that year.

Karina Habšudová and Helena Suková won in the final 3–6, 6–3, 6–2 against Eva Martincová and Elena Pampoulova.

Seeds
Champion seeds are indicated in bold text while text in italics indicates the round in which those seeds were eliminated.

n/a
 Eva Martincová /  Elena Pampoulova (final)
 Denisa Krajčovičová /  Radka Zrubáková (first round)
 Wiltrud Probst /  Patty Schnyder (quarterfinals)
 Ruxandra Dragomir /  Silvia Farina (semifinals)

Draw

External links
 1996 Pupp Czech Open Doubles draw

1996 - Doubles
Doubles